Fatty acid binding protein 6, ileal (gastrotropin), also known as FABP6, is a protein which in humans is encoded by the FABP6 gene.

Function 
This gene encodes the ileal fatty acid binding protein. Fatty acid binding proteins are a family of small, highly conserved, cytoplasmic proteins that bind long-chain fatty acids and other hydrophobic ligands. FABP6 and FABP1 (the liver fatty acid binding protein) are also able to bind bile acids. It is thought that FABPs roles include fatty acid uptake, transport, and metabolism. Transcript variants generated by alternate transcription promoters and/or alternate splicing have been found for this gene.

References

Further reading